Beijing Yintai Centre is located in the core of the Beijing central business district. It is a three-towered structure with the central tower rising 250 m high and the two flanking towers about 186 m. The central tower consists of Park Hyatt Beijing, penthouses and residences.

The project was designed by John Portman. Structural engineering was done by LeMessurier Consultants.

See also

Beijing Yintai Centre Tower 2

References

Buildings and structures in Chaoyang District, Beijing
Skyscraper hotels in Beijing
Hyatt Hotels and Resorts
Residential skyscrapers in China
John C. Portman Jr. buildings